Horse Creek is a  tributary of the Arkansas River that flows from a source south of Calhan in the Holcolm Hills of El Paso County, Colorado.  It flows east and south to a confluence with the Arkansas in Otero County west of Las Animas

See also
List of rivers of Colorado

References

Rivers of Colorado
Tributaries of the Arkansas River
Rivers of Otero County, Colorado
Rivers of El Paso County, Colorado